Garcinia semseii is a species of flowering plant in the family Clusiaceae that grows primarily in the wet tropical biome.It is found only in Tanzania.

References

semseii
Endemic flora of Tanzania
Vulnerable plants
Taxonomy articles created by Polbot